E. Gregory Wells (born June 28, 1961) is an American lawyer and judge from Maryland. He is the Chief Judge of the Appellate Court of Maryland.

Education 

Wells was born in Washington, DC and attended Gonzaga College High School. He earned his Bachelor of Arts from The College of William & Mary and received his Juris Doctor from the University of Virginia School of Law.

Legal career 

Wells served as an Assistant State's Attorney in Prince George's County from 1989-94. Wells then served as Deputy State's Attorney for Calvert County from 1995-98. In 1998, Wells was selected to become a Magistrate (formerly Master) in Domestic Relations and Juvenile Causes in the Calvert County Circuit Court, serving until 2005. Between 2005 and 2006, Wells served as the State's Attorney for Calvert County before leaving to serve as an Assistant Attorney General in the Criminal Appeals Division of the Office of the Attorney General of Maryland from 2007-08.

Judicial career 

From September 8, 2008, to November 15, 2012, Wells was an associate judge of the District Court of Maryland, District 4, Calvert County. He served on the Calvert County Circuit Court from 2012 to 2019, first as an associate judge from November 15, 2012 to March 1, 2019, and then as a county administrative judge from March 1, 2019 to March 21. On March 12, 2019, governor Larry Hogan announced the appointment of Wells to be a judge on the Maryland Court of Special Appeals. On February 17, 2022 Governor Hogan announced that he was appointing Wells Chief Judge of the Court of Special Appeals, succeeding Chief Judge Matthew J. Fader upon his appointment to the Maryland Court of Appeals.

References 

Living people
1961 births